Irgandı Bridge is an historical bridge in Bursa, Turkey. It is between Osmangazi (northwest) and Yıldırım (southeast),  two second level municipalities of Greater Bursa

History
The bridge was commissioned by a wealthy merchant named Müslihiddin in 1442 during the reign of Murat II of the Ottoman Empire. Its architect was probably Architect Timurtaş. During the 1855 Bursa earthquake the bridge was partially damaged. During the Turkish War of Independence  Bursa was occupied by Greece. In 1922, the bridge was bombed by the retreating Greek army. It was closed to traffic. In 1949 the bridge was reconstructed by the municipality albeit with minor modifications. After 2004, following another restoration the bridge was opened to traffic.

Details 
The bridge is a single arc bridge. It is an example of a rare type of covered bridge which houses a bazaar. It has been claimed (incorrectly) locally that it is one of only four bridges in the world having shops. Other bridges with shops on them are Ponte Vecchio and Ponte Rialto in Italy; Osam Bridge in Bulgaria; Pulteney Bridge in Avon, High Bridge in Lincoln, and "Frome Bridge" in Frome in the United Kingdom; and Krämerbrücke in Erfurt, Germany. In the original design there were thirty shops on the bridge. According to Ass. Prof Önge during the Ottoman times, the bridge was also used to check traffic between two neighborhoods of Bursa by closing during the nights.

References

External links

Ottoman bridges in Turkey
Bridges with buildings
Buildings and structures in Bursa
Bridges completed in 1442
Transport in Bursa
Ottoman architecture in Bursa